Lhasa Urban Construction Investment Football Club was a Chinese football club founded in 2017 and last participated in the China League Two. The team was based in Deyang, Sichuan. They wore yellow home kits and blue away kits.

On June 12, 2020 the club was announced to be dissolved.

Coaching staff

Managerial history
  Xie Yuxin (2017)
  Zhang Biao (2018–2019)

Results
All-time league rankings

As of the end of 2019 season.

 In group stage.

Key
<div>

 Pld = Played
 W = Games won
 D = Games drawn
 L = Games lost
 F = Goals for
 A = Goals against
 Pts = Points
 Pos = Final position

 DNQ = Did not qualify
 DNE = Did not enter
 NH = Not Held
 WD = Withdrawal
 – = Does Not Exist
 R1 = Round 1
 R2 = Round 2
 R3 = Round 3
 R4 = Round 4

 F = Final
 SF = Semi-finals
 QF = Quarter-finals
 R16 = Round of 16
 Group = Group stage
 GS2 = Second Group stage
 QR1 = First Qualifying Round
 QR2 = Second Qualifying Round
 QR3 = Third Qualifying Round

External links
Team profile at worldfootball.net

References

Football clubs in Sichuan
Defunct football clubs in China
Association football clubs established in 2017
2017 establishments in China
2020 disestablishments in China
Association football clubs disestablished in 2020
 
Deyang